"Heaven Says Hello" is an April 1968 single by Sonny James.  "Heaven Says Hello" went to number one on the country charts for one week, and spent a total of  sixteen weeks on the chart.

Chart performance

Cover Versions
Later in 1968,Slim Whitman recorded the song.

References

External links
 The song, provided by YouTube: https://www.youtube.com/watch?v=Ee8KCgRGOn0

1968 singles
Sonny James songs
Songs written by Cindy Walker
Capitol Records singles
1968 songs